Cottonwood High School is a public high school located in Murray, Utah, United States.  The current enrollment is nearly 1700 and is the most diverse school in the Granite School District, and one of the most diverse in the state of Utah. The school offers traditional schooling for grades nine through twelve. A portion of the building is also leased to Academy for Math, Engineering, and Science (AMES), a charter high school.

History 
The school's mascot is the Cottonwood Colt and its colors are black, white and gold. Cottonwood High School is one of nine senior high schools in the Granite School District.

The building includes a large auditorium with a maximum capacity of just over 3,000. Because of the auditorium's size, it has been used for many concerts and public functions over the years. The annual production of Michael McLean's The Forgotten Carols is held in the auditorium each December. The facilities are used year-round for citywide events, night school for adults, summer school for young children, and other activities.

The building has an innovative layout which includes an open-air courtyard, several atriums (including the lunch area), and gifts from graduating classes, the most visible of which are a bronze statue of a colt located near the lunchroom and the school's seal in tilework in the main foyer (gifted by Class of 2003 alum).

Athletics
Several teams are state champions.

 Baseball (boys')
 Basketball (boys' & girls')
 Cheerleading (boys' & girls')
 Drill a.k.a. Chapparrals (Girls')
 Cross Country (boys' & girls')
 Football (boys')
 Golf (boys' & girls')
 Hockey (boys' & girls')
 Lacrosse (boys' & girls')
 The Biking of Mountains
 Soccer (boys' & girls')
 Softball (girls')
 Swimming (boys' & girls')
 Track & Field (boys' & girls')
 Tennis (boys' & girls')
 Ultimate Frisbee (boys' & girls')
 Volleyball (girls')
 Water Polo (boys' & girls')
 Wrestling (boys' & girls')

Notable alumni
 Gary Andersen, Head Coach, at Utah State University
 Klea Blackhurst, actress, Broadway and The Onion
 Josh Burkman, professional mixed martial artist
 Annette Cottle, volleyball player and coach
 Richard Paul Evans, author and founder of the Christmas Box House International charity
 Charles Halford, actor
 Stanley Havili, professional football player
 Alejandra Ibáñez, 2020 Paralympic bronze medalist in women's wheelchair basketball
 David Litvack, Minority Leader in the Utah House of Representatives
 Lindsay Pulsipher, actress
 Chris Shelton, professional baseball player 
 Will Swenson, actor and director
 David Cruz Thayne, small businessman; former chief of staff of Utah State Minority Leader Scott Howell; 2012 congressional candidate
 Tayler Wiles, professional cyclist for Trek-Segafredo (women's team)
 Joey Worthen, professional soccer player

See also
 List of high schools in Utah

References

External links

 Official Cottonwood High website

Educational institutions established in 1970
Public high schools in Utah
Schools in Salt Lake County, Utah
Charter schools in Utah
Buildings and structures in Murray, Utah
1970 establishments in Utah